Jean Bock (15 January 1931 – 11 September 2022) was a Belgian politician. He was a member of the Liberal Reformist Party (PRL) and later the Reformist Movement (MR).

Life and career
Bock's childhood was impacted by the loss of his mother at the end of World War II. He earned a teacher's diploma from the École normale de l’État de Verviers and conducted his military service from 1951 to 1952. He then taught at the École communale de Limerlé before leaving for the Belgian Congo from 1955 to 1960 in the Kasaï Province. There, he met his future wife, Andrée Léonard, with whom he had two children.

Upon his return to Belgium, Bock ran for office in the Provincial Council of Luxembourg in 1961, but was not elected until four years later. He served in the Council from 1965 to 1981 and served in the cabinets of budget minister Willy De Clercq and justice minister Pierre Wigny.

Jean Bock died on 11 September 2022, at the age of 91.

Distinctions
Officer of the Order of the Crown (1977)
Commander of the Order of Orange-Nassau (1994)
Grand Officer of the Order of Leopold (1999)
Commander of the Order of Merit of the Grand Duchy of Luxembourg

References

1931 births
2022 deaths
20th-century Belgian politicians
21st-century Belgian politicians
Mayors of places in Belgium
Members of the Senate (Belgium)
Members of the Parliament of Wallonia
People from Luxembourg (Belgium)
Order of Leopold (Belgium)
Officers of the Order of the Crown (Belgium)
Commanders of the Order of Orange-Nassau
Commanders of the Order of Merit of the Grand Duchy of Luxembourg